Interference is the act of interfering, invading, or poaching. Interference may also refer to:

Communications
 Interference (communication), anything which alters, modifies, or disrupts a message
 Adjacent-channel interference, caused by extraneous power from a signal in an adjacent channel
 Co-channel interference, also known as crosstalk
 Electromagnetic interference, disturbance that affects an electrical circuit
 Inter-carrier interference, caused by Doppler shift in OFDM modulation
 Intersymbol interference

Entertainment
 Interference (band), an Irish band which formed in 1984
 Interference (Crease album), 1995 
 Interference (Cubanate album), 1998
 Interference (film), Paramount's first all-talking film
 "Interference" (Prison Break episode), a 2007 episode
 Interference – Book One, a 1999 Doctor Who  novel by Lawrence Miles
 Interference – Book Two, a 1999 Doctor Who  novel by Lawrence Miles
 Interference (novel), a 2019 novel by Sue Burke

Science

Biology 
 Crossover interference, non-random placement of crossovers with respect to each other during meiosis
 RNA interference, a process within living cells that moderates the activity of their genes
 Vaccine interference, interaction between two or more vaccines mixed in the same formulation
 Viral interference, one viral infection inhibiting another

Physics
 Interference engine
 Interference fit, in engineering
 Interference lithography, in optics
 Thin-film interference, in optics
 Wave interference, in physics

Other
 Interference ripples, in geology
 Interference theory, in psychology

Sports
 Pass interference, a penalty in American football and Canadian Football
 Interference (baseball), changing the course of play from what is expected
 Interference (ice hockey)

Other uses
 Interference (chess)
 Interference proceeding, in U.S. patent law
 Interfering thread nut, a type of locknut 
 Statistical interference, in statistics

See also 
 Intervention (disambiguation)